MZF may refer to:

 Mzamba Airport, South Africa (by IATA code)
 Mehrzweckfahrzeug, a type of emergency land ambulance in Germany known as MZF
 MZF1, a protein
 Yangum language, spoken in Papua New Guinea (by ISO 639 code)